Thomas Edward Gill (March 18, 1908 – November 11, 1973) was a Roman Catholic titular bishop of Lambaesis and auxiliary bishop of the Roman Catholic Archdiocese of Seattle. He is the first Seattle-born priest to be ordained a bishop.

Born in Seattle, Washington, Gill was ordained to the priesthood for the Archdiocese of Seattle on June 10, 1933, after completing his studies at St. Patrick's Seminary in Menlo Park, California. In 1939, Father Gill became the director of Catholic Charities of the Diocese of Seattle, which was incorporated the following year in 1940 and coordinated orphanages as well as homes for the elderly and troubled youths.

On April 11, 1956, Gill was appointed bishop, and was consecrated on May 31. As auxiliary bishop, Gill built Catholic Children's Services into the largest private child‐care agency in Washington state and served as the pastor of St. James Cathedral in Seattle.

Bishop Gill died of a heart attack while checking into the Statler Hilton Hotel for a meeting of the National Conference of Catholic Bishops.

Notes

Participants in the Second Vatican Council
People from Seattle
Roman Catholic Archdiocese of Seattle
20th-century American Roman Catholic titular bishops
1908 births
1973 deaths
Religious leaders from Washington (state)
Catholics from Washington (state)
American Roman Catholic clergy of Irish descent